Palfuria caputlari is a spider species of the family Zodariidae.

Etymology
The epithet is composed of two Latin nouns: caput = "head" and lari from larus = "gull". It refers to the shape of the median apophysis as seen from the side.

Distribution
P. caputlari occurs in Tanzania.

References

 Tamás Szüts, T. & Jocqué, R. (2001). A revision of the Afrotropical spider genus Palfuria (Araneae, Zodariidae). Journal of Arachnology 29(2):205–219. PDF

Zodariidae
Spiders of Africa
Spiders described in 2001